The Super 10 was a rugby union football tournament featuring ten teams from Australia, New Zealand, South Africa, Tonga, and Western Samoa. The competition ran for three years from 1993 to 1995 and was the predecessor of Super 12 and Super 14, now known as Super Rugby.

History 
The Super 10 replaced the Super 6 and the previous South Pacific Championship and CANZ Series tournaments which had been organized by the Australian and New Zealand rugby unions during the 1980s and early 1990s. With South Africa being readmitted into international sport due to the dismantling of apartheid (both The Wallabies and the All Blacks toured South Africa during 1992), there was an opportunity to launch an expanded competition also featuring South Africa's top provincial teams. The South African Broadcasting Corporation's Top Sport channel committed to a three-year sponsorship of the competition, allowing it to be launched.

The official declaration of professionalism in rugby union in August 1995 led to a reworking of the competition. SANZAR, a partnership between the South African Rugby Union, the New Zealand Rugby Union and the Australian Rugby Union was formed, and in association with Rupert Murdoch's News Limited, they created the Super 12. That fully professional competition featured teams from Australia, New Zealand and South Africa only, with one more team from each country being admitted, and was launched in 1996

Past winners 
Winners by year:

Format 
The ten teams for the competition were arranged as follows:

 Two Australian teams (New South Wales and Queensland).
 Four New Zealand teams (the top four teams from the previous year's National Provincial Championship).
 Three South African teams (the top three teams from the previous year's Currie Cup).
 The winner of the previous year's Pacific Tri-Nations between Fiji, Tonga and Western Samoa.

The ten teams were split into two pools to minimize the logistical problems caused by the travel required and the time zone differences between the participating countries. Each team played the other four teams in their pool once, with four competition points being awarded for a win, two for a draw, and one for a loss by seven points or less. Bonus points for scoring four or more tries were not introduced until the formation of the Super 12.

The top team in each pool met in a final to decide the championship.

1993 season

Pool A

Standings

Matches

Pool B

Standings

Matches

Final

1994 season

Pool A

Standings

Matches

Pool B

Standings

Matches

Final

1995 season

Pool A

Standings

Matches

Pool B

Standings

Matches

Final

See also
South Pacific Championship

References 

 

Defunct rugby union competitions in South Africa
Rugby union competitions in Samoa
Rugby union competitions in Tonga
Defunct rugby union leagues in Australia
Rugby union leagues in New Zealand
Sports leagues established in 1993
Rugby union competitions for provincial teams
1993 in Australian rugby union
1994 in Australian rugby union
1995 in Australian rugby union
1993 in New Zealand rugby union
1994 in New Zealand rugby union
1995 in New Zealand rugby union
1993 in South African rugby union
1994 in South African rugby union
1995 in South African rugby union
1993 in Oceanian rugby union
1994 in Oceanian rugby union
1995 in Oceanian rugby union